Sefer Raziel HaMalakh (Hebrew:, "the book of Raziel the angel") is a grimoire of Practical Kabbalah from the Middle Ages written primarily in Hebrew and Aramaic. Liber Razielis Archangeli, its 13th-century Latin translation produced under Alfonso X of Castile, survives.

Textual history
The book cannot be shown to predate the 13th century, but may in parts date back to late antiquity. Like other obscure ancient texts such as the Bahir and Sefer Yetzirah, the work has been extant in a number of versions.

The book claims to have been revealed to Adam by the angel Raziel. The title itself is mentioned in another magical work of late antiquity, The Sword of Moses. Critical historians regard it as a medieval work, most probably originating among the Ashkenazi Hasidim, as citations from it begin to appear only in the 13th century. One section was available to Ibn Ezra before 1153, when he finished his commentary to Exodus. The likely compiler of the medieval version is Eleazar of Worms, as Sefer Galei Razia, which developed to what we have now as Sefer Raziel, including more writings written by people of various theological opinions. According to Jacob Emden, it was compiled by Abraham Abulafia.

Contents

It draws heavily on Sefer Yetzirah and Sefer HaRazim "Book of Secrets". There are multiple manuscript versions, containing up to seven tractates. The printed version of Sefer Raziel is divided into five books, some of it in the form of a mystical midrash on Creation. It features an elaborate angelology, magical uses of the zodiac, gematria, names of God, protective spells, and a method of writing magical healing amulets.

Book six of the Liber Razielis is based on Sefer haRazim, with various additions including the "Prayer of Adam" of Sefer Adam.

The book became notorious in German Renaissance magic, named together with Picatrix as among the most abominable works of necromancy by Johannes Hartlieb. The prayer of Adam is paraphrased by Nicholas of Cusa in two sermons (Sermo I, 4, 16.25; Sermo XX, 8, 10-13) and further made use of by Johann Reuchlin in his De Arte Cabbalistica.
Konrad Bollstatter in the 15th century  also shows awareness of the Latin version of the "Prayer of Adam" an interpolation in Cgm 252, although he replaces Raziel with Raphael and Seth with Sem.

Tree of Knowledge
Adam, in his prayer to God, apologized for listening to his wife Eve חוה, who was deceived by the snake into eating from the Tree of Knowledge - the עץ הדעת, according to the Book of Raziel, God sent the highest of the angels, Raziel, to teach Adam the spiritual laws of nature and life on Earth, including the knowledge of the planets, stars and the spiritual laws of creation.

The angel Raziel also taught Adam the knowledge of the power of speech, the power of thoughts and the power of a person's soul within the confines of the physical body and this physical world, basically teaching the knowledge with which one can harmonize physical and spiritual existence in this physical world.

The angel Raziel teaches the power of speech, the energy contained within the 22 letters of the Hebrew alphabet, their combinations and meanings of names.

Adam and Abraham

According to Jewish traditions, the angel Raziel was sent to Earth to teach Adam, and due to the elevated soul of Abraham, Raziel returned to teach Abraham all the spiritual knowledge and spiritual laws. Raziel was sent to Earth with specific purpose to teach Adam and Abraham the ways of Nature. The Book of Raziel explains everything from astrology of the planets in the Solar System, and explains how the creative life energy starts with a thought from the spiritual realms, prior to manifestation as speech and action in this physical world. The eternal divine creative life energy of this earth is love, the book explains the spiritual laws of birth, death, reincarnation of the soul, and many spiritual laws of "change".

Heptameron

The Heptameron, ascribed to Petrus de Apono, is based on the Book of Raziel.

Editions
 רזיאל המלאך. Amsterdam (1701) Chabad-Lubavitch Library. Full-text PDF version, in Hebrew, from HebrewBooks.org
 Steve Savedow (trans.), Sepher Rezial Hemelach: The Book of the Angel Rezial,  Red Wheel/Weiser (2000), .

 The Book of the Angel Raziel. Volume I / Transl. from Hebrew and Aramaic and comm. by E. V. Kuzmin; editorship and foreword by B. K. Dvinyaninov. — St. Petersburg: Academy Of Culture's Research, 2020. — 264 pp.: illustrated, — (Code Grimoire Series).  (на русском языке)
 The Book of the Angel Raziel. Volume II / Transl. from Hebrew and Aramaic, afterword and comm. by E. V. Kuzmin; editorship and foreword by B. K. Dvinyaninov. — St. Petersburg: Academy Of Culture’s Research, 2021. — 512 pp.: illustrated, — (Code Grimoire Series).  (на русском языке)

See also
 Hebrew astronomy
 Jewish astrology
 Jewish views on astrology
 Primary texts of Kabbalah

References

Further reading
 Avilés, A.G., Alfonso X y el Liber Razielis: imágenes de la magia astral judía en el scriptorium alfonsí, Bulletin of Hispanic Studies, Volume 74, Number 1, 1 January 1997, pp. 21–39

External links
 The Original ספר "Sefer" Book of Raziel ספר רזיאל המלאך The Amsterdam Edition of Sefer Raziel "Book of Raziel" ספר רזיאל המלאך

Kabbalah texts
Astrological texts
Hebrew-language names
Jewish grimoires
Adam and Eve